The following outline is provided as an overview of and topical guide to Puerto Rico:

The Commonwealth of Puerto Rico is a self-governing unincorporated territory of the United States of America located in the northeastern Caribbean, east of the Dominican Republic and west of the Virgin Islands.  The commonwealth comprises an archipelago that includes the main island of Puerto Rico and a number of smaller islands and keys, the largest of which are Vieques, Culebra, and Mona.  The main island of Puerto Rico is the least extensive but the third most populous of the four Greater Antilles:  Cuba, Hispaniola, Jamaica, and Puerto Rico.

Puerto Ricans often call the island Borinquen, from Borikén, its indigenous Taíno name. The terms boricua and borincano derive from Borikén and Borinquen respectively, and are commonly used to identify someone of Puerto Rican heritage. The island is also popularly known as "La Isla del Encanto", which translated means "The Island of Enchantment."

General reference 

 Pronunciation:
 Common English country name:  Puerto Rico
 Official English country name:  The Commonwealth of Puerto Rico
 Common endonym(s):  
 Official endonym(s):  
 Adjectival(s): Puerto Rican
 Demonym(s):
 Etymology: Name of Puerto Rico
 ISO country codes:  PR, PRI, 630
 ISO region codes:  See ISO 3166-2:PR
 Internet country code top-level domain:  .pr

Geography of Puerto Rico 

Geography of Puerto Rico

 Puerto Rico is
 an archipelagic island country (see also List of island countries)
 a self-governing unincorporated territory of the United States
 organized as a commonwealth
 Location:
 Northern Hemisphere and Western Hemisphere
 North America (though not on the mainland)
 Atlantic Ocean
 North Atlantic
 Caribbean
 Antilles
 Greater Antilles
 Time zone: Eastern Caribbean Time (UTC-04)
 Extreme points of Puerto Rico
 High: Cerro de Punta 
 Low: Caribbean Sea 0 m
 Land boundaries: none
 Coastline: 501 km
 Population of Puerto Rico: 3,285,874 – 31st most populous US jurisdiction
 Area of Puerto Rico: 9,104 km2
 Atlas of Puerto Rico

Environment of Puerto Rico 

 Climate of Puerto Rico
 Environmental issues in Puerto Rico
 Renewable energy in Puerto Rico
 Geology of Puerto Rico
 Protected areas of Puerto Rico
 Biosphere reserves in Puerto Rico
 National parks of Puerto Rico
 Superfund sites in Puerto Rico
 Wildlife of Puerto Rico
 Flora of Puerto Rico
 Fauna of Puerto Rico
 Birds of Puerto Rico
 Mammals of Puerto Rico

Natural geographic features of Puerto Rico 

 Beaches in Puerto Rico
 Glaciers: None
 Islands of Puerto Rico
 Lakes of Puerto Rico
 Mountains of Puerto Rico
 Rivers of Puerto Rico
 Waterfalls of Puerto Rico
 Valleys of Puerto Rico
 World Heritage Sites in Puerto Rico

Regions of Puerto Rico 
Regions of Puerto Rico

Ecoregions of Puerto Rico 
List of ecoregions in Puerto Rico
 Ecoregions in Puerto Rico
 Puerto Rican dry forests
 Puerto Rican moist forests

Administrative divisions of Puerto Rico 
Administrative divisions of Puerto Rico

 Provinces of Puerto Rico
 Districts of Puerto Rico
 Municipalities of Puerto Rico

Provinces of Puerto Rico 
Provinces of Puerto Rico

Districts of Puerto Rico 
Districts of Puerto Rico

Municipalities of Puerto Rico 
Municipalities of Puerto Rico

 Capital of Puerto Rico: San Juan
 Cities of Puerto Rico

Demography of Puerto Rico 
Demographics of Puerto Rico

Government and politics of Puerto Rico 
Politics of Puerto Rico

 Form of government:
 Capital of Puerto Rico: San Juan
 Elections in Puerto Rico
 Political parties in Puerto Rico
 Taxation in Puerto Rico

Branches of the government of Puerto Rico 
Government of Puerto Rico

Executive branch of the government of Puerto Rico 

 Head of state: President of the United States
 Head of government: Governor of Puerto Rico, Pedro R. Pierluisi
 Puerto Rico Department of State
 Puerto Rico Department of Economic Development and Commerce

Legislative branch of the government of Puerto Rico 

 Legislative Assembly of Puerto Rico (bicameral)
 Upper house: Senate of Puerto Rico
 Lower house: House of Representatives of Puerto Rico

Judicial branch of the government of Puerto Rico 
Court system of Puerto Rico
 Supreme Court of Puerto Rico

Foreign relations of Puerto Rico 
Foreign relations of Puerto Rico

 Consular Offices in Puerto Rico
 United States-Puerto Rico relations

International organization membership 

The Commonwealth of Puerto Rico is a member of:
 Caribbean Community and Common Market (Caricom) (observer)
 International Criminal Police Organization (Interpol) (subbureau)
 International Olympic Committee (IOC)
 International Trade Union Confederation (ITUC)
 Universal Postal Union (UPU)
 World Confederation of Labour (WCL)
 World Federation of Trade Unions (WFTU)
 World Tourism Organization (UNWTO) (associate)

Law and order in Puerto Rico 
Law of Puerto Rico

 Cannabis in Puerto Rico
 Constitution of Puerto Rico
 Crime in Puerto Rico
 Human rights in Puerto Rico
 LGBT rights in Puerto Rico
 Freedom of religion in Puerto Rico
 Law enforcement in Puerto Rico

Military of Puerto Rico 
Military history of Puerto Rico

 Command
 Commander-in-chief:
 Military of Puerto Rico
 Puerto Rico National Guard
 Puerto Rico Air National Guard
 List of Puerto Rican military personnel

Local government in Puerto Rico 
Local government in Puerto Rico

History of Puerto Rico 
History of Puerto Rico

 Military history of Puerto Rico
Grito de Lares
Intentona de Yauco
Puerto Ricans in World War I
Puerto Ricans in World War II
65th Infantry Regiment
Puerto Ricans in the Vietnam War
Indigenous people
Ortoiroid people
Saladoid people
Arawak
Taíno
On November 19, 1493, a Spanish fleet under the command of Christoffa Corombo (Christopher Columbus) lands on a large island inhabited by Taíno people that he names San Juan Bautista (Saint John the Baptist, now Puerto Rico).
On August 8, 1508, Spanish conquistador Juan Ponce de León establishes Capárra, the first European settlement on the island of San Juan Bautista.
 Viceroyalty of New Spain, 1519–1821
 Captaincy General of Puerto Rico, 1580-1898
 Military history of Puerto Rico
 Royal Decree of Graces of 1815
 El Grito de Lares of 1868
 Moret Law of 1870
 Intentona de Yauco of 1898
 Spanish–American War, April 23 – August 12, 1898
 Spanish Empire declares war on the United States, April 23, 1898
 United States invasion of Puerto Rico, July 25, 1898
 Treaty of Paris, December 10, 1898
 United States Military government of Porto Rico, December 10, 1898 – May 1, 1900
 Foraker Act of 1900
 World War I, June 28, 1914 – November 11, 1918
 Territory of Porto Rico (United States), March 2, 1917 – May 17, 1932
 Jones–Shafroth Act of March 2, 1917
 Puerto Ricans in World War I War on April 6, 1917
 Territory of Puerto Rico (United States), May 17, 1932 – July 25, 1952
 Puerto Ricans in World War II, September 1, 1939 – September 2, 1945
 Cold War, September 3, 1945  – December 31, 1992
 Korean War, June 25, 1950 – July 27, 1953
 Puerto Rican Nationalist Party Revolts of the 1950s
 Ponce massacre
 Río Piedras massacre
 Jayuya Uprising
 Utuado Uprising
 San Juan Nationalist revolt
Estado Libre Asociado de Puerto Rico (Commonwealth of Puerto Rico) since July 25, 1952
 Constitution of Puerto Rico of July 25, 1952
 Puerto Ricans in the Vietnam War, March 8, 1965  – March 29, 1973
 Persian Gulf War, August 2, 1990 – February 28, 1991
 War on Terror since September 12, 2001
 Afghanistan War, October 7, 2001  – December 31, 2016
 Iraq War, March 20, 2003  – December 18, 2011
 Political status of Puerto Rico
History of women in Puerto Rico

Culture of Puerto Rico 
Culture of Puerto Rico

 Ethnicity in Puerto Rico
 African immigration to Puerto Rico
 Chinese immigration to Puerto Rico
 Corsican immigration to Puerto Rico
 French immigration to Puerto Rico
 German immigration to Puerto Rico
 Irish immigration to Puerto Rico
 Jewish immigration to Puerto Rico
 Spanish immigration to Puerto Rico
 Cultural diversity in Puerto Rico
 Festivals in Puerto Rico
 Media in Puerto Rico
 National symbols of Puerto Rico
 Coat of arms of Puerto Rico
 Flags of Puerto Rico
 National anthem of Puerto Rico
 People of Puerto Rico
History of women in Puerto Rico
 Public holidays in Puerto Rico
 Religion in Puerto Rico
 Buddhism in Puerto Rico
 Christianity in Puerto Rico
 Roman Catholicism in Puerto Rico
 Protestantism in Puerto Rico
 Hinduism in Puerto Rico
 Islam in Puerto Rico
 Judaism in Puerto Rico
 World Heritage Sites in Puerto Rico

Art in Puerto Rico 

 Architecture of Puerto Rico
 Art in Puerto Rico
 Cinema of Puerto Rico
 Literature of Puerto Rico
 Music of Puerto Rico
 Television in Puerto Rico
 Theatre in Puerto Rico

Cuisine

 Cuisine of Puerto Rico
 Piragua

Sports in Puerto Rico 
Sports in Puerto Rico

The history of organized sports in Puerto Rico
 Football in Puerto Rico
 Puerto Rico at the Olympics

Economy and infrastructure of Puerto Rico 
Economy of Puerto Rico

 Economic rank, by nominal GDP (2007): 95th (ninety-fifth)
 Agriculture in Puerto Rico
 Banking in Puerto Rico
 Puerto Rico Government Development Bank
 Communications in Puerto Rico
 Internet in Puerto Rico
 Companies of Puerto Rico
Currency of Puerto Rico: Dollar
ISO 4217: USD
 Energy in Puerto Rico
 Energy policy of Puerto Rico
 Oil industry in Puerto Rico
 Mining in Puerto Rico
 Tourism in Puerto Rico
 Transport in Puerto Rico
 Puerto Rico Stock Exchange

Education in Puerto Rico 
Education in Puerto Rico

Infrastructure of Puerto Rico

 Health care in Puerto Rico
 Transportation in Puerto Rico
 Airports in Puerto Rico
 Rail transport in Puerto Rico
 Roads in Puerto Rico
 Water supply and sanitation in Puerto Rico

See also

Topic overview:
Puerto Rico

Index of Puerto Rico-related articles

References

External links 

 Puerto Rico government
  
 United States government
Application of the U.S. Constitution in U.S. Insular Areas
 United Nations (U.N.) Declaration on Puerto Rico
 U.N. Decolonization Committee's press release on what it deems as the colonial political status of Puerto Rico
 Country, Regions and territories profiles
 BBC Territory profile
 Encyclopædia Britannica profile
 CIA - The World Factbook
 Other
 

Puerto Rico
 1